Cyaniris semiargus, the Mazarine blue, is a Palearctic butterfly in the family Lycaenidae.

Subspecies
Subspecies include:
 Cyaniris semiargus semiargus (Europe, Caucasus, Siberia, Russian Far East)
 Cyaniris semiargus altaiana (1909) (Tian-Shan, Altai Mountains, Sayan Mountains, Transbaikalia)
 Cyaniris semiargus amurensis (1909) (Amur river, Ussuri, Japan)
 Cyaniris semiargus atra (1885) (Ghissar, Alai Mountains, Darvaz)
 Cyaniris semiargus jiadengyunus (1992) (Altai Mountains)
 Cyaniris semiargus maroccana (1920 (Morocco)
 Cyaniris semiargus tartessus (2007) (SW. Spain)
 Cyaniris semiargus transiens , 1910 (Spain)
 Cyaniris semiargus uralensis (1909) (Urals)

Distribution
The Mazarine blue's population is distributed throughout continental Europe,  reaching into the Arctic Circle , Morocco, and the Middle East  then east across the Palearctic to Siberia and the Russian Far East. There was a large native population in Britain in the early part of the 19th century, but it disappeared before the 20th century, though single vagrants have been spotted, and some estimates of British resident extinction are as late as 1906. In 2009, UNESCO was researching a possible reintroduction of the Mazarine blue to Britain.
Recently, the Mazarine blue's numbers have been declining in its European range (particularly Scandinavia) and the reason remains unclear.

Habitat
This common species inhabits meadows, pastures, grasslands and flowery grassy damp areas up to 2200m. It seems to prefer places which are not fertilized and not used for fodder production.

Description

The wingspan of the male and female are similar, at 32–38 mm.

These butterflies present a sexual dimorphism. The male Mazarine blue's wings are a deep blue with a heavy venation and are slightly larger in diameter than the female's. The upperside of the wings shows black borders and white fringes. The female Mazarine blue is brown. The underside of the wings is greyish or ocher, with a series of black spots surrounded by white and a blue scaling in the basal area.

Both sexes lack orange markings and have a dark violet or brown body colour. The butterfly has been compared to the common blue, and the Grecian Helena subspecies which has orange markings.

This species is rather similar to Cupido minimus, but in the underside hindwings of the Mazarine blue the black spot in space 6 and the two spots next to it form an obtuse angle, while in C. minimus they create an acute angle.

The larva is yellow green with darker lines and has fine hairs and dark brown spiracles. The pupa is olive green and attached to the food plant with a silk girdle.

Biology
This species has one brood each year. It overwinters as a young larva. Adults fly from May to August. Caterpillars mainly feed on Red Clover (Trifolium pratense) and other species of Trifolium (Trifolium medium, Trifolium spadiceum), on Vicia cracca, Anthyllis, Genista and Melilotus.

Gallery

Bibliography
D.J. Carter (ill. B. Hargreaves), Guide des chenilles d'Europe, Delachaux et Niestlé, coll. «Les guides du naturaliste », 2001, 311 p.
  (2007): Description of Cyaniris semiargus tartessus subspec. nov. from the National Park of Doñana (SW. Spain) (Lepidoptera, Lycaenidae). ISSN 0171-0079 | Atalanta, 38(1/2): 185–188. Full article: .
Haworth (1803) Haworth, A.H. (1803) Lepidoptera Britannica. 
Leach (1815) Leach (1815) In Brewster: The Edinburgh Encyclopædia. 
Lewin (1795) Lewin, W. (1795) The Papilios of Great Britain.
Swainson (1827) Swainson, W. (1827) A Sketch of the Natural Affinities of the Lepidoptera Diurna of Latreille. The Philosophical magazine : or Annals of chemistry, mathematics, astronomy, natural history and general science.
Tolman T., Lewington R. Collins Field Guide Butterflies of Britain & Europe — London : Harper Collins Publishers, 1997.— 320 p., 106 col. Pl
Tom Tolman et Richard Lewington, Guide des papillons d'Europe et d'Afrique du Nord, Delachaux et Niestlé, 2010

References

Polyommatini
Butterflies of Europe
Butterflies of Asia
Insects of the Arctic